The Cathedral of Saint John of Nepomuk is a Roman Catholic Cathedral in Zrenjanin, Serbia. It is the seat of the Roman Catholic Diocese of Zrenjanin that covers the territory of Serbian Banat. The Cathedral is located in the Zrenjanin's main square, Trg slobode (Freedom Square). It is dedicated to Saint John of Nepomuk.

History 
For the duration of the Ottoman rule (1552–1718) there stood a mosque, but was razed down by the Austrians following Turkish withdrawal from the city and Banat. However, this is not the first cathedral built following the removal of the mosque. Prior to the cathedral seen today, a Baroque-style church, built in 1768, stood in its place. Over the next century, the building deteriorated badly and the authorities decided to build a new one. The construction of the present-day cathedral commenced in 1864 by the project of Franz Xaver Brandeisz, who also built several churches in Banat, and lasted four years.

Features 
The Zrenjanin Cathedral was built in the Neoclassical style. The interior was decorated by Josef Goigner from  Tyrol and the cathedral features a pipe organ made in Timișoara, in 1907. Windows are decorated with stained glass.

Due to the cathedral's size, the steeple can be seen from most parts of the city.

See also
List of cathedrals in Serbia
Religion in Vojvodina
Roman Catholicism in Serbia

References
Zrenjanin Cathedral (in Serbian)

External links
 http://www.gcatholic.org/dioceses/diocese/zren0.htm Diocese of Zrenjanin

Roman Catholic cathedrals in Serbia
Cathedrals in Vojvodina
Buildings and structures in Vojvodina
Zrenjanin
Roman Catholic churches in Vojvodina